The following is a list compiling the total number of career victories in NASCAR Cup Series competition. The list recognizes "Cup" victories under the following auspices:

Strictly Stock (1949)
Grand National Series (1950–1970)
Winston Cup Series (1971–2003)
Nextel Cup Series (2004–2007)
Sprint Cup Series (2008–2016)
Monster Energy NASCAR Cup Series (2017–2019)
NASCAR Cup Series (2020–present)

This led to the elimination of shorter races (50 to 150 miles) from the schedule. Seasons since 1972 are referenced as the "modern era" largely due to the schedule and distance changes. Years since 2004 are generally referred to as the "Chase Era or Playoffs Era." Only points-paying championship races count towards the total.

Note that the Daytona qualifying races prior to 1972 were points-paying championship races, and count in the totals below. Since 1972, the Daytona qualifying races do not count due to the race distance change rules. Wins in The Clash, All-Star Race, or international exhibitions at Calder Park Raceway, Suzuka, or Motegi do not count.

Total wins

Win table
All figures correct as of the Ambetter Health 400 at Atlanta Motor Speedway (March 19, 2023).

Record progression

Most wins at different tracks

List of drivers who have won on at least 15 different racetracks. Wins on dirt and paved surface of same track counts as two different track wins, because it changes the characteristics of the race. The reconfigurations of Trenton Speedway in 1968 (from 1 to 1.5 miles), Richmond Raceway in 1988 (from 0.5 to 0.75 miles), Atlanta Motor Speedway in 1997 (from classic shape to quad oval) and Phoenix Raceway in 2018 (moving start/finish line to dogleg and changing racing line) count as a new racetrack because the shape and length have fundamentally changed. The different length variants of Sonoma Raceway with or without chute also counts separately. All other changes to not count as new track layouts, in particular the relocation of the start/finish line in Darlington or banking changing in some turns of various intermediate ovals.

Current tracks and drivers 
The following table provides a comparison of which drivers have achieved at least one race win on certain racetracks. Only drivers who have won at least 10 different racetracks are listed. Wins in bonus races without scoring for the championship are marked with NC.

Note:
 X - at least one win in a points race
 NC - at least one win in a non-points race
 - -  participation, but no win
 no entry = no participation

Historical 
Here is a list of the drivers who have the most wins on different racetracks in a certain category. The criterion for inclusion is that the driver either has an entry in the all-time ranking or has won at least 2/3 of the different racetracks (in a certain category) on which he competed. The drivers are first sorted according to the absolute number of racetracks on which they have at least one race win. If several drivers have the same number of wins, they are sorted in descending order according to the relative ratio. A driver who has only driven on 3 different racetracks but has won on all 3 racetracks has a better ranking than a driver who competed on 4 racetracks and also achieved at least one victory on 3 racetracks.
The absolute number of race wins is not decisive, so it does not matter whether a driver has 1 or more wins on a particular racetrack.

Dirt tracks

Paved short tracks

Intermediates and mile ovals

Superspeedways and 2-mile ovals

Road courses and temporary street circuits

Most wins at each track

Current driver wins on current tracks

All-time Winners

Short Tracks

Intermediates

Superspeedways

Road Courses and Street Circuits

Winners on tracks used only one time 

List of winners on tracks, that were used only one-time in Cup NASCAR history.

See also
 List of NASCAR Cup Series champions
 List of NASCAR tracks

References

External links
 Racing-Reference.info

All-time Cup Series winners
All-time winners